Pope Stephen VII (died 15 March 931) was the bishop of Rome and nominal ruler of the Papal States from February 929 to his death in 931. A candidate of the infamous Marozia, his pontificate occurred during the period known as the Saeculum obscurum.

Election
Stephen was a Roman by birth, the son of Germanic (Goth) Theodemundus/Theudemund . He was the cardinal-priest of St Anastasia in Rome. He was probably handpicked by Marozia, the true ruler of Rome during the Saeculum obscurum, to become pope as a stop-gap measure until her own son John was ready to assume the role.

Pontificate
Very little is known about Stephen's pontificate. During his two years as pope, Stephen confirmed the privileges of a few religious houses in France and Italy. As a reward for helping free Stephen from the oppression of Hugh of Arles, Stephen granted Cante di Gabrielli the position of papal governor of Gubbio, and control over a number of key fortresses. Stephen was also noted for the severity with which he treated clergy who strayed in their morals. He was also, apparently, according to a hostile Greek source from the twelfth century, the first pope who went around clean shaved whilst pope.

Stephen died around 15 March 931, and was succeeded by Marozia's son John XI.

References

 Mann, Horace K., The Lives of the Popes in the Early Middle Ages, Vol. IV: The Popes in the Days of Feudal Anarchy, 891-999 (1910)
 

Popes
Italian popes
Bishops of Anagni
931 deaths
Year of birth unknown
10th-century popes
Burials at St. Peter's Basilica